Verne L. Miller (May 11, 1908 – October 8, 1982) was an American football player. He played college football for Carleton and St. Mary's (MN) and in the National Football League (NFL) as a halfback for the Minneapolis Red Jackets (1930). He appeared in five NFL games, two as a starter.

References

1908 births
1982 deaths
Minneapolis Red Jackets players
Players of American football from Grand Rapids, Michigan
American football halfbacks
Carleton Knights football players
Saint Mary's Redmen football players